Beth El Jewish Center of Flatbush is a historic synagogue at 1981 Homecrest Ave. in Flatbush, Brooklyn, New York, New York.  It was built in 1927 and is a two-story plus basement, rectangular red brick building with decorative white glazed terra cotta trim. It has a tripartite front facade with a central parapet.  It features Byzantine and Gothic Revival decorative elements.

It was listed on the National Register of Historic Places in 2009.

References

External links
Official website

Byzantine Revival architecture in New York City
Byzantine Revival synagogues
Gothic Revival architecture in New York City
Gothic Revival synagogues
Synagogues completed in 1927
Properties of religious function on the National Register of Historic Places in Brooklyn
Synagogues in Brooklyn
Synagogues on the National Register of Historic Places in New York City